George Wilson (born May 9, 1942) is a retired American professional basketball player.

Early life
A 6'8" (2.03 m), 225 lb (102 kg) center, Wilson starred at Marshall High School in Chicago, Illinois. He led the Commandos to four straight appearances in the Chicago Public League, and they won Illinois state championships in 1958 and 1960.

As a senior, he was named a high school All-American after three seasons of averaging 25, 27, and 26 points per game, and in 1960 he was the inaugural winner of the Chicago Sun-Times Player of the Year award. Wilson was named All-State three years.

College career
Recruited by many colleges, he chose to attend the University of Cincinnati primarily because of his admiration of Bearcats' star Oscar Robertson. As a sophomore in his first year on the varsity in 1961–62, he broke into the starting lineup for Ed Jucker's Bearcats in the 14th game, and for the season he averaged 9.2 points per game. The Bearcats were co-champions of the Missouri Valley Conference (MVC) and posted a record of 29–2, capping off the season by winning the NCAA championship game over Ohio State 71–59, the Bearcats' second consecutive national title.

As a junior in 1962–63, Wilson led the Bearcats with 11.2 rebounds per game, a .505 field goal percentage. and 1.4 blocked shots to go with 15.0 points per game. He was named All-MVC, and he was named second-team All-American by The Sporting News and Converse. The Bearcats went 26–2, again won the MVC and advanced to the NCAA championship game for the third consecutive season, but they were beaten by Loyola University Chicago in overtime, 60–58.

In his senior season of 1963–64, Wilson (who was team co-captain with Ron Bonham) again led the Bearcats in rebounding with 12.5 per game, field goal percentage at .535 and blocked shots with 1.7 per game. He set a new Bearcats record with eight blocked shots in a game against Dayton. He also poured in 16.1 points per game as he was again named All-MVC. The Bearcats finished the season 17–9.

1964 Olympics
Wilson was a member of the U.S. Olympic basketball team that went undefeated and won the gold medal in the 1964 Summer Olympics in Tokyo, Japan.

NBA career
Wilson was then drafted by the Cincinnati Royals with their territorial selection in the 1964 NBA draft.

He played seven seasons in the NBA with the Royals, Chicago Bulls, Seattle SuperSonics (acquired via the 1967 NBA Expansion Draft), Phoenix Suns (acquired via the 1968 NBA Expansion Draft), Philadelphia 76ers, and Buffalo Braves (acquired via expansion draft prior to the 1970–71 season), averaging 5.4 points per game and 5.2 rebounds per game in his career.

Personal life
Wilson graduated from the University of Cincinnati in 1964 with a degree in education.  He is also a member of the Beta Eta chapter of Kappa Alpha Psi fraternity.

In 2006 Wilson was voted as one of the 100 Legends of the IHSA Boys Basketball Tournament, a group of former players and coaches in honor of the 100 anniversary of the IHSA boys basketball tournament. In 2010 Wilson was inducted into the Ohio Basketball Hall of Fame.

Wilson currently works as a YMCA director and lives in Fairfield, Ohio. He has competed in the Senior Olympics in golf, basketball, and horseshoes.

References

1942 births
Living people
African-American basketball players
American men's basketball players
Basketball players at the 1964 Summer Olympics
Basketball players from Mississippi
Buffalo Braves expansion draft picks
Buffalo Braves players
Centers (basketball)
Chicago Bulls players
Cincinnati Bearcats men's basketball players
Cincinnati Royals draft picks
Cincinnati Royals players
Medalists at the 1964 Summer Olympics
Olympic gold medalists for the United States in basketball
Parade High School All-Americans (boys' basketball)
People from Fairfield, Ohio
Philadelphia 76ers players
Phoenix Suns expansion draft picks
Phoenix Suns players
Seattle SuperSonics expansion draft picks
Seattle SuperSonics players
Sportspeople from the Cincinnati metropolitan area
Sportspeople from Meridian, Mississippi
United States men's national basketball team players
21st-century African-American people
20th-century African-American sportspeople